Midland Township is one of eleven townships in Merrick County, Nebraska, United States. Its population was 193 at the 2020 census, but a 2021 estimate placed the township's population at 193.

See also
 County government in Nebraska

References

External links
 City-Data.com

Townships in Merrick County, Nebraska
Townships in Nebraska